Erkenntnis is a journal of philosophy that publishes papers in analytic philosophy. Its name is derived from the German word "Erkenntnis", meaning "knowledge, recognition". The journal was also linked to organisation of conferences, such as the Second Conference on the Epistemology of the Exact Sciences, of which it published the papers and accounts of the discussions.

First series (1930–1940)
When Hans Reichenbach and Rudolf Carnap took charge of Annalen der Philosophie und philosophischen Kritik in 1930 they renamed it Erkenntnis, under which name it was published 1930–1938. The journal was published by the Gesellschaft für Empirische Philosophie,  or the Berlin Circle and the Verein Ernst Mach, Vienna. In the first issue Reichenbach noted that the editors hoped to gain a better understanding of the nature of all human knowledge through consideration of the procedures and results of a variety of scientific disciplines, whilst also hoping that philosophy need not remain a series of "systems" but could reach the state of being objective knowledge. The final issue of the first series, Volume 8, No. 1 was published in 1939 and retitled The Journal of Unified Science (Erkenntnis) (1939–1940) and included as associate editors Philipp Frank, Jørgen Jørgensen (:da:Jørgen Jørgensen_filosof), Charles W. Morris, Otto Neurath, and Louis Rougier. The advent of World War II led to the cessation of publication.

Second series (1975–present)
In 1975 the journal was "refounded" by Wilhelm K. Essler, Carl G. Hempel and Wolfgang Stegmüller, and it has been published continuously ever since. The journal's current editor-in-chief is Hannes Leitgeb (Ludwig Maximilian University of Munich), and the supervisory board is composed of Michael Friedman (Stanford University), Hans Rott (University of Regensburg), and Wolfgang Spohn (Konstanz University).

See also
List of philosophy journals

References

Epistemology journals
Analytic philosophy literature
Vienna Circle